Babelomurex depressispiratus is a species of sea snail, a marine gastropod mollusc in the family Muricidae, the murex snails or rock snails.

Distribution
The holotype of this marine species was found off New Caledonia.

References

 Oliverio, M., 2008. - Coralliophilinae (Neogastropoda: Muricidae) from the southwest Pacific. Mémoires du Muséum national d'Histoire naturelle 196: 481-585

depressispiratus
Gastropods described in 2008